Contraxiala obliqua is a species of sea snail, a marine gastropod mollusk in the family Pyramidellidae, the pyrams and their allies. The species is the only known species to exist within the genus, Contraxiala.

Distribution
This species occurs in the Great Barrier Reef, off the northeast coast of Queensland, Australia, Australia.

References

External links
 To World Register of Marine Species

Pyramidellidae
Gastropods described in 1956